Actors Anonymous is a novel by American author and actor James Franco. Published in 2013 by Little A/New Harvest, the novel is a series of connected short stories about actors in Los Angeles. The chapters follow the 12 Steps and the 12 Traditions of Alcoholics Anonymous.

On 11 October 2013, James Franco appeared in a book trailer along with actors Jim Parrack, Scott Haze, Stacey Miller and Mia Serafino to promote the release of the book.

Reception to Actors Anonymous was mixed. Critics complained that the otherwise interesting and well-written stories were marred by name dropping and references to the author's own career and personal philosophy.

References 

2013 American novels